is a dam in Tainai, Niigata, Japan, completed in 1976.  It is a gravity-type concrete dam aiming for flood control and unspecified water intake.  It is 93 meters in height.

History 
The small and medium river refurbishment project was started in 1949 on the Tessouchi River flowing through Wessai City.  As a result, levees capable of withstanding a flood of 700 cubic meters per second.  However,  the levees were broke due to flood damage in July, 1966.  As a result, dam construction began.

References 

Dams in Niigata Prefecture
Dams completed in 1976